David "Sudz" Sutherland is a Canadian film director and screenwriter. His credits include the films Doomstown, Love, Sex and Eating the Bones, Guns, Speakers for the Dead and Home Again, as well as episodes of Drop the Beat, Da Kink in My Hair, Degrassi: The Next Generation, Wild Roses, Jozi-H, Reign, She's the Mayor, Designated Survivor, Shoot the Messenger, Murdoch Mysteries, Frankie Drake Mysteries, Batwoman and Superman & Lois.

He is married to screenwriter and producer Jennifer Holness, his partner in Hungry Eyes Film & Television.

Filmography

Television

Awards and Nominations

References

External links 
 

Canadian television directors
Canadian male screenwriters
Black Canadian writers
Film directors from Toronto
Writers from Toronto
Living people
Black Canadian filmmakers
Canadian Film Centre alumni
Year of birth missing (living people)
Canadian film production company founders